Paolo (Paul) Salvatore Abbate (April 9, 1884 – April 1, 1973) was an Italian-born sculptor and minister who lived and worked in Connecticut.

Personal life and education

Paolo Abbate was born in Villarosa on the Italian island of Sicily. He studied under Domenico Trentacoste, director of the Accademia di Belle Arti Firenze. In 1902, he moved to the United States. Abbate was a missionary for seven years for the American Missionary Association in Pittsfield, Massachusetts before moving to Torrington, Connecticut in 1928 where he established the Sul Monte Art Association, which sponsored exhibitions of the work of local artists. His studio became a gathering place for artists and art enthusiasts. He went on to found the Torrington Artists Association and to co-found the Torrington Unico National organization.

Career

Abbate was a Realist sculptor who worked with bronze and marble. He served as the president of the International Fine Arts League and was a member of numerous professional organizations such as the National Sculpture Society, Kent Art Association and the Connecticut Artists & Writers Society.

Notable collections

Brown University, Providence, Rhode Island
City of Newburgh, Newburgh, New York
Mattatuck Museum Arts and History Center, Waterbury, Connecticut
National Arts Club, New York City
Torrington Historical Society, Torrington, Connecticut

Selected works
 Bust of Dante Alighieri, Brown University (bronze, granite base, c. 1900)
 Bust of Dante Alighieri, Newburgh Free Library courtyard (1921)
 Imagination, Mattatuck Museum, Waterbury (bronze)
 Seated female nude, Mattatuck Museum, Waterburg (bronze)

References

Notes

Bibliography

American Missionary Association The American Missionary: Volume 76. Albany: American Missionary Association, Congregational Home Missionary Society, 1922.

External links
Paolo S. Abbate papers in the collection of the Archives of American Art

1884 births
1973 deaths
People from Villarosa
Italian emigrants to the United States
People from Torrington, Connecticut
20th-century American sculptors
20th-century American male artists
American male sculptors
Artists from Sicily